Animals is an American adult animated comedy television series created by Phil Matarese and Mike Luciano. The first two episodes were independently produced and presented at the Sundance Film Festival in January 2015. In May 2015, HBO picked the series up with a two-season order, which premiered on February 5, 2016. The series was renewed for a third season on May 19, 2017. Season 3 premiered on August 3, 2018. In October 2018, it was announced that HBO had canceled the series.

Plot
Each episode features a different cast of special guests, along with creators Matarese and Luciano playing various animals. The show features retroscripting and improvised dialogue based on plot outlines. Each season also has a story arc featuring humans in live-action sequences, such as a corrupt mayor and the events leading to his reelection in season one.

In season two, the human story arc concerns a reporter investigating a virus outbreak created by mad scientist Dr. Labcoat, who is forced to release a gas that dissolves all human life in New York.

In season three, which takes place three years after the dubbed "Green Day" incident, the animals of New York have formed their own governments while they are being observed by two soldiers who are losing their grip on reality.

Cast

Main
 Phil Matarese as himself
 Humans: Private Matarese
 Rats: Phil Jr. Also portrayed Phil Jr.'s biological father in the first episode.
 Pigeons
 Cats: Emperor Phil, a sociopathic cat who was initially the mayor's cat. Also portrayed Phil, a mafia cat who took over the family business.
 Dogs
 Flies
 Squirrels
 Roaches
 Worms
 Horses
 Mike Luciano as himself
 Humans: Private Luciano
 Rats: Mike, Phil Jr's best friend. Also portrayed Phil Jr.'s grandfather in his youth.
 Pigeons
 Cats: Emperor Mike, a sociopathic cat who was initially the mayor's cat. Also portrayed Mike, a mafia cat leaving organized crime.
 Dogs
 Flies
 Squirrels
 Roaches
 Worms
 Horses

Recurring

Humans
 RuPaul Charles as Dr. Labcoat, the antagonist of season two's human storyline. A scientist of the unscrupulous conglomerate Pesci Co., Labcoat arranged for an epidemic in New York to sell the 'Green Pill' to enslave the populace. But after being exposed, Labcoat ends up destroying himself when he wiped out the human populace of New York. Posthumously, he established the Labcoat terrorists of season three.
 John Early as The Assistant, Dr. Labcoat's aid and accomplice.
 Demi Moore as The General, the antagonist of season three's human storyline.
 Mel Rodriguez as The Lieutenant

Animals
 Katie Aselton as Rebecca, Mom
 Neil Casey as Principal Lief, a rat principal at the high school Phil Jr. and Mike attended in the first two seasons. He also played the human Executive 3, a Pesci Co. employee that became the founding leader of the Labcoats in season 3 after Dr. Labcoat subjected him to a mutative strain of the Green Pill in season 2, and Reporter.
 Jay Duplass as Dennis
 Lauren Lapkus as Jacob, CO298
 Jon Lovitz as Himself, Old Ben
 Claudia O'Doherty as April
 Mindy Sterling as Psychic Lady
 Kurt Vile as Himself

Guest stars

 Jhené Aiko as Mary
 Jason Alexander as Algae
 Stephanie Allynne as TO89W
 Eric André as Alex
 Aziz Ansari as Charles
 Scott Aukerman as Drug Dealer
 Awkwafina as Annie
 Bob Balaban as Himself
 Marianne Jean-Baptiste as Giraffe
 Amir Blumenfeld as Caterer 1
 Big Boi as Fox 2
 Alex Borstein as Lois Griffin
 Jessica Chastain as Sarah
 Emilia Clarke as Lumpy
 Brett Davis as Lizard Executive
 Charlie Duncan as Maddie
 Mark Duplass as Ken
 Mary Elizabeth Ellis as Wendy
 Josh Fadem as FDB Representative
 Edie Falco as Psycho
 Nathan Fielder as DJ Lab Rat
 Whoopi Goldberg as Dorothy
 Kim Gordon as Tulip
 Judy Greer as Ali
 David Harbour as Hawk
 Dan Harmon as Ad Man 1
 Jonah Hill as Pesicorp President
 Mary Holland as Ashley, 69-69-420x
 Jake Hurwitz as Caterer 2
 Mitchell Hurwitz as Larry
 Brandon Johnson as Ad Man 3
 Jay Johnston as Ad Man 4
 January Jones as Diana
 Dinosaur Jr. as Themselves as Beavers
 Mindy Kaling as Sandy
 Ellie Kemper as Princess
 Harmony Korine as Corey
 Nick Kroll as Jerry
 James Kyson
 Jennifer Lafleur as Wife
 Donna Lewis as Donna Lewis Rat
 Lucy Liu as Yumi
 Melanie Lynskey as Linda
 Anthony Mackie as Receipt
 Jason Mantzoukas as Fink
 Demetri Martin as Graham
 Marc Maron as Marc Maron Rat
 Tatiana Maslany as Sherman
 Danny McBride as Gregory
 Killer Mike as Fox 1
 Moby as Moby Pig
 Robert Morse as Old Phil
 Kumail Nanjiani as Rusty
 Meghan O'Neill as Meghan, Natalie, Angels
 Gil Ozeri as Chuck
 Adam Pally as Max
 Chelsea Peretti as Angela
 Michael Rapaport as Erik
 Andy Richter as Prisoner
 Justin Roiland as H&M
 Paul Rust as Mason
 Horatio Sanz as Julio
 Ben Schwartz as Antonio, Geoff
 Adam Scott as Shane
 Rory Scovel as Ronnie
 Ty Segall as Himself
 Molly Shannon as Olivia
 Alia Shawkat as Sharon
 Pauly Shore as Pat
 Jenny Slate as Snake
 Cobie Smulders as Anni
 Jessica St. Clair as Kaitlin
 Dino Stamatopoulos as Ad Man 2
 Wanda Sykes as Chance
 Raven Symone as Nurse
 Jacob Tremblay as Nuke
 Usher as Miles
 Marlon Wayans as Ry-Ry
 Shawn Wayans as Tommy
 Joe Wengert as Priest, Baker, Boyfriend
 Erin Whitehead as 49C74
 Casey Wilson as Queen Ant
 John Witherspoon as Jimmy
 Zach Woods as Brian
 Steve Zissis as Husband
 A$AP Ferg as Bodega Cat 1
 A$AP Rocky as Bodega Cat 2
 Nick Hexum as Himself 
 SA Martinez as Himself
 Jet Eveleth as Scarf Rat

Episodes

Critical reception
The first season has received positive reviews from critics. As of April 2020, it holds a 68% "Fresh" rating on review aggregator website Rotten Tomatoes, based on 19 reviews, with an average of 6.5/10. On Metacritic, the series holds a rating of 54 out of 100, based on 12 critics, indicating "mixed or above average reviews". Maureen Ryan of Variety gave the first season a negative review, writing, "The animated HBO show has a lot in common with programs like Girls, Louie, and Baskets, and like Togetherness, it boasts Mark and Jay Duplass as executive producers. But the extraordinarily tedious Animals., unlike those shows, fails to hit any of its chosen targets. It is unfunny, its animation is unexceptional and the studied banality of its dialogue is excruciating." Conversely, David Wiegand in the San Francisco Chronicle gave the season a positive review, writing, "The deadpan approach only enhances the delicious off the wall comedy of Animals. The series is batty and brilliant as it turns the whole notion of anthropomorphic cartoon animals on its fuzzy ear."

See also
 HouseBroken, another adult-animated series featuring talking animals.
Room 104
Togetherness
Portlandia, sketches featured talking rats.

References

Further reading
 ‘Animals’: The Story Behind HBO’s Twisted, NSFW Adult Cartoon. Rolling Stone. Retrieved April 25, 2022

External links
 
 

2010s American adult animated television series
2010s American animated comedy television series
2016 American television series debuts
2018 American television series endings
American adult animated comedy television series
English-language television shows
HBO original programming
Animated television series about birds
Animated television series about cats
Animated television series about dogs
Animated television series about horses
Animated television series about insects
Animated television series about squirrels
Television shows set in New York City
Television series by Duplass Brothers Productions